Spiriferida is an order of extinct articulate brachiopod fossils which are known for their long hinge-line, which is often the widest part of the shell. In some genera (e.g. Mucrospirifer) it is greatly elongated, giving them a wing-like appearance. They often have a deep fold down the center of the shell. The feature that gives the spiriferids their name ("spiral-bearers") is the internal support for the lophophore; this brachidium, which is often preserved in fossils, is a thin ribbon of calcite that is typically coiled tightly within the shell.

Spiriferids first appear in the Late Ordovician with the appearance of Eospirifer radiatus. They increased in diversity throughout the Silurian and underwent a dramatic evolutionary radiation during the Devonian period, reaching peak development in variety and numbers. Spiriferida survived the great Permian extinction, finally becoming extinct during the Early to Middle Jurassic.

Fossils of this order are often preserved as pyrite.

Taxonomy
Order Spiriferida
Suborder Delthyridina
Superfamily Delthyridoidea
Family Acrospiriferidae
Family Cyrtinopsidae
Family Delthyrididae
Family Hysterolitidae
Family Mucrospiriferidae
Superfamily Reticularioidea
Family Elythidae
Family Reticulariidae
Family Thomasariidae
Family Xenomartiniidae
Suborder Spiriferidina
Superfamily Adolfioidea
Family Adolfiidae
Family Echinospiriferidae 
Superfamily Ambocoelioidea
Family Ambocoeliidae
Family Eudoxinidae
Family Lazutkiniidae
Family Verneuiliidae 
Superfamily Brachythyridoidea
Family Brachythyrididae
Family Skelidorygmidae 
Superfamily Cyrtioidea (syn. Cyrtiacea)
Family Costispiriferidae
Family Cyrtiidae
Family Hedeinopsidae
Superfamily Cyrtospiriferoidea
Family Conispiriferidae
Family Cyrtospiriferidae
Family Spinocyrtiidae
Superfamily Martinioidea
Family Crassumbidae
Family Elythynidae
Family Gerkispiridae
Family Ingelarellidae
Family Martiniidae
Family Perissothyrididae
Family Tenellodermidae 
Superfamily Paeckelmanelloidea
Family Paeckelmanellidae
Family Strophopleuridae 
Superfamily Spiriferoidea
Family Choristitidae
Family Imbrexiidae
Family Reticulariacea
Family Spiriferellidae
Family Spiriferidae
Family Trigonotretidae 
Superfamily Theodossioidea
Family Palaeochoristitidae
Family Theodossiidae
Family Ulbospiriferidae

References 

 Introduction to the Spiriferida at berkeley.edu
 Spiriferida at the Paleos website
 Zhan, RenBin, JiSuo Jin, Yan Liang, and LingKai Meng. "Evolution and paleogeography of Eospirifer (Spiriferida, Brachiopoda) in Late Ordovician and Silurian." Science China Earth Sciences 55, no. 9 (2012): 1427–1444.

 
Protostome orders
Prehistoric brachiopods
Brachiopod orders